Sir William George MacKenzie Sutherland  (12 November 1933 – 30 May 2022), often known as Bill Sutherland, was a British police officer.

Sutherland was born in Inverness and educated at Inverness Technical High School. He did his national service in the Royal Engineers, serving in Japan during the Korean War.

After military service, he joined Cheshire Constabulary in  1954. He moved to Surrey Constabulary in 1973, where he became chief superintendent in command of the Guildford division in 1974. There, he took charge of the response to the Guildford pub bombings of 5 October 1974. In 1975, he moved to Hertfordshire Constabulary as assistant chief constable, and in 1979 was appointed chief constable of Bedfordshire Constabulary. In 1983, he returned to Scotland as chief constable of Lothian and Borders Police, where he remained from thirteen years. He then served as HM Chief Inspector of Constabulary for Scotland from 1996 to 1998.

Sutherland was awarded the Queen's Police Medal (QPM) in the 1981 New Year Honours and knighted in the 1988 Birthday Honours.

While in Cheshire, he married policewoman Jennie Abbott, who came from Lancashire. They had two daughters, Alison and Anne.

Notes

1933 births
2022 deaths
People from Inverness
Chief Inspectors of Constabulary (Scotland)
Knights Bachelor
Scottish recipients of the Queen's Police Medal
People educated at Inverness Technical High School
British Chief Constables
Royal Engineers soldiers